Villages located in Nawa Tehsil, Rajasthan State, India.

Abas
Abhaypura
Adaksar
Ajeetpura
Anandpura (Anatpura)
Asanpura
Aspura
Bajna
Bangarh
Banwali
Baori
Baralpura
Barjan
Batliya
Begpura
Bhagwanpura
Bhairupura
Bhanwarpura
Bhanwata
Bhatipura
Bhawanipura
Bheenchron Ka Bas
Bheevpura
Bhilal
Bhooni
Bijapura
Budhdeopura
Butinathpura
Chak Daron Ka Bas
Chandpura city
Charanwas
Chawandiya
Chhapri
Chitawa
Chosla
Dabsi
Danpura
Daron Ka Bas
Daulatpura
Dediya Ka Bas
Deeppura
Deola
Devli Kalan
Deonagar
Daipur
Deusar
Dhuto Ki Dhani
Gandhi Gram
Gauravpura
Gawariya
Gharwani
Ghatwa
Gogor
Gopal Pura
Govindi
Gugarwar
Gurha Rajawata
Gurha Salt
Hanumanpura
Haripura
Haritpura
Hariya Joon
Hirani
Hudeel
Indali (Nirmal Gram Panchayat)
Indokha
Jabdi Nagar
Jasrana
Jaswantpura
Jawanpura
Jeejot
Jeenwar
Jiliya
Joshipura
Kakot
Kaliyawas
Kaloli
Kanchanpura
Kankariya
Kanpura
Kansera
Kantiya
Karkeri
Kasari
Keriyawas
Kerpura
Khakharki
Khardapura
Khardiya
Khariya
Khoranda
Khorandi
Khushiya
Kokpura
Kooni
Kotra
Kuchaman City
Kukanwali
Lakhanpura
Lakhji Ka Bas
Lalas
Lamba
Lichana
Lohrana
Loonwa
Lora Ka Bas
Lorpura
Maharajpura
Mandawara
Mangalpura
Manglodi
Manji Ki Dhani
Manpura
Maroth (see Panch Mahal Maroth)
Matasukha
Meethri
Minda
Mohanpura
Moondgasoi
Moonpura
Moti Ram Ki Dhani
Motipura
Muwana
Nagwara
Nalot
Nanana
Narayanpura
Narsinghpura
Nawa
Naya Bas
Nehru Nagar
Nolasiya
Nonpura
Ompura
Palara
Palri
Panchota
Panchwa
Panwari
Parewadi
Piprali
Prempura
Purohiton Ka Bas
Rajas
Rajliya
Rajpura
Ramnagar
Rampura
Ram pura
Ranasar
Ranwa
Rasal
Rewasa Dalelpura
Riksa
Rooppura
Rughnathpura
Sabalpura
Samoton Ka Bas
Sanwatgarh
Saranpura
Sardarpura
Sargoth Padampura
Sawaipura
Shekhawatpura
Sherpura
Sheshma Ka Bas
Shimbhoopura
Shiv
Shivdanpura
Shivpurvi
Shrawanpura
Shri Nagar
Shyamgarh
Sidiyas
Sindhupura
Sirsi
Solaya
Sujanpura
Suratpura
Takiya
Thathana
Thikariya Kalan
Thikariya Khurd
Tirsingiya
Todas
Torda
Udaipura
Ugarpura
Ukhamasar
Ulana
Vijay Nagar

Nagaur district
Nagaur villages